Norah Mary Phillips, Baroness Phillips, JP (née Lusher; 12 August 1910 – 14 August 1992) was a British Labour Party politician.

Phillips was educated at Hampton Training College as a teacher. She became active in her local Fulham Labour Party and in 1930 married fellow Fulham activist Morgan Phillips, a former miner and later the General Secretary of the Labour Party 1944–1961. They had a son and a daughter, Gwyneth Dunwoody, who became a long-serving Labour Member of Parliament.

Phillips was a long-serving London magistrate and co-founder of the National Association of Women's Clubs (1935). She was made a life peer on 21 December 1964 as Baroness Phillips, of Fulham in the County of Greater London and was the first female government whip in the House of Lords, as Baroness-in-Waiting 1965–70.

She championed consumer issues and in 1965 founded the Housewives Trust to help shoppers obtain better value for money. In 1977 she became director of the Association for the Prevention of Theft in Shops.

She served as Lord Lieutenant of Greater London from 1978 to 1985.

References

1910 births
1992 deaths
Life peeresses created by Elizabeth II
Labour Party (UK) life peers
Lord-Lieutenants of Greater London
People from Fulham
20th-century British women politicians
Ministers in the Wilson governments, 1964–1970
Life peers created by Elizabeth II